Bürglen railway station is a railway station in  Bürglen, in the Swiss canton of Thurgau. It is an intermediate stop on the standard gauge Winterthur–Romanshorn line of Swiss Federal Railways.

Services 
Bürglen is served by the S5 and S10 of the St. Gallen S-Bahn:

 : half-hourly service between Wil and Romanshorn.

References

External links 
 
 

Railway stations in the canton of Thurgau
Swiss Federal Railways stations